Valbrenta is a comune in the province of Vicenza, Veneto region of Italy. It was formed on 30 January 2019 with the merger of the comunes of Campolongo sul Brenta, Cismon del Grappa, San Nazario and Valstagna.

Sources

Cities and towns in Veneto